Nabi (Nambi), a.k.a. Metan, is a Torricelli language of Papua New Guinea. It was assigned to the Maimai branch in Ross (2005).

The language is spoken in three villages; according to Ethnologue, in two they prefer the name Nabi, and in the third Metan.

References

 Ross, Malcolm (2005). "Pronouns as a preliminary diagnostic for grouping Papuan languages." In: Andrew Pawley, Robert Attenborough, Robin Hide and Jack Golson, eds, Papuan pasts: cultural, linguistic and biological histories of Papuan-speaking peoples, 15-66. Canberra: Pacific Linguistics.

Maimai languages
Languages of Sandaun Province